John Hyland (born 20 June 1962) is a British boxer. He competed in the men's bantamweight event at the 1984 Summer Olympics.

He won the 1983 and 1984 Amateur Boxing Association British bantamweight title, when boxing out of the St. Ambrose ABC.

References

External links
 

1962 births
Living people
British male boxers
Olympic boxers of Great Britain
Boxers at the 1984 Summer Olympics
Boxers from Liverpool
Bantamweight boxers